The Phnom Penh International Airport station is a station on Line 03 of the Phnom Penh BRT bus rapid transit network in Phnom Penh, Cambodia, located on the Russian Confederation Boulevard. It is located outside of Phnom Penh International Airport.

See also
 Phnom Penh City Bus
 Transport in Phnom Penh
 Line 03 (Phnom Penh Bus Rapid Transit)

External links
 Official Page of Phnom Penh Municipal Bus Services

Phnom Penh BRT station